is the eighth single of the Japanese boy band Arashi. The single was released in two editions. While both the regular edition and limited edition contains the song and its instrumental, the two editions differ in covers and sizes: the regular edition being twelve centimeters and the limited edition being 8 centimeters. Both editions also contain a hidden track of a Secret Talk, an audio recording of the group's casual conversations. It was certified gold by the RIAJ for a shipment of 200,000 copies.

Single information
"Nice na Kokoroiki" was used as the eleventh ending theme song for the anime Kochira Katsushika-ku Kameari Kōen-mae Hashutsujo. The single was released with the group's name spelled in katakana (アラシ) instead of kanji (嵐).

Track listing

Chart positions

References

External links
 Nice na Kokoroiki product information 
 Nice na Kokoroiki Oricon profile 

Arashi songs
2002 singles
Kochira Katsushika-ku Kameari Kōen-mae Hashutsujo
Oricon Weekly number-one singles